Robert Reid (born 21 December 1932) is an Australian former ice hockey player. He competed in the men's tournament at the 1960 Winter Olympics.

References

External links

1932 births
Possibly living people
Australian ice hockey goaltenders
Ice hockey players at the 1960 Winter Olympics
Olympic ice hockey players of Australia
Sportspeople from Glasgow
Scottish emigrants to Australia
Sportspeople from Melbourne
Sportsmen from Victoria (Australia)